Peter and the Wolf is a 1936 composition by Sergei Prokofiev, which has been often performed, recorded and adapted.

Peter and the Wolf may also refer to:
 Peter and the Wolf (1946 film), Disney's animated version narrated by Sterling Holloway
 Peter and the Wolf (narrated by David Bowie), a 1978 recording of the original narrated by Bowie
 Peter and the Wolf ("Weird Al" Yankovic and Wendy Carlos album), 1988
 Peter and the Wolf (Dave Van Ronk album), 1990
 Peter & the Wolf (Jimmy Smith album), 1966
 Peter and the Wolf (narrated by Vivian Stanshall), 1975
 Peter & the Wolf (2006 film), an animated film directed by Suzie Templeton
 Peter and the Wolf (band), a band from Austin, TX
 Wolf Tracks and Peter and the Wolf, a 2005 album by Jean-Pascal Beintus
 Peter and the Wolf (short story), a short story from Angela Carter's anthology Black Venus
 Peter and the Wolf, a picture book adapted and illustrated by Chris Raschka
 Peter and the Wolf (TV special), a 1995 animated television special directed by George Daugherty
 Petr & the Wulf, album by Muly and the Lupercalians